The Patty Berg Classic was a women's professional golf tournament in Minnesota on the LPGA Tour from 1973 to 1980. Played at Keller Golf Course in Maplewood, a suburb north of St. Paul, the tournament was named in honor of hall of famer Patty Berg.

Winners
Patty Berg Golf Classic
1980 Beth Daniel (2)

Patty Berg Classic
1979 Beth Daniel
1978 Shelley Hamlin
1977 Bonnie Lauer
1976 Kathy Whitworth
1975 Jo Ann Washam

St. Paul Open
1974 JoAnne Carner
1973 Sandra Palmer

See also
Patty Berg Classic (Massachusetts) - an unrelated one-time LPGA Tour event played in June 1969 in Sutton, Massachusetts.

References

Former LPGA Tour events
Golf in Minnesota
Sports in Minneapolis–Saint Paul
Recurring sporting events established in 1973
Recurring sporting events disestablished in 1979
1973 establishments in Minnesota
1979 disestablishments in Minnesota
Women's sports in Minnesota